Winter Canal (Zimnyaya kanavka) is a canal in Saint Petersburg, Russia, connecting Bolshaya Neva with Moika River in the vicinity of Winter Palace.

The canal was dug in 1718–19.

The granite embankment was built in 1782–84, and railings designed by sculptor I.F.Dunker were added at the same time. The special picturesqueness to the canal is added by the arch connecting Old Hermitage and Hermitage Theater, built by architect Yury Felten next to the Hermitage Bridge.

Names 
Originally the canal was named Old Palace Canal. From 1780 it was called either Winter House Canal or Winter Palace Canal. Townspeople started to call it simply  (meaning Winter Canal), and in 1828 the canal was officially renamed to its current name – Winter Canal (pronounced in Russian as Zimnyaya Kanavka, literally meaning Winter Groove).

Bridges 
There are three bridges across Winter Canal:

 Hermitage Bridge (along Palace Embankment)
 First Winter Bridge (along Millionnaya Street) 
 Second Winter Bridge (along Moika River Embankment)

References 

Canals of Saint Petersburg
Canals opened in 1719
1719 establishments in Russia
Cultural heritage monuments of federal significance in Saint Petersburg